Qawwali (Punjabi:  (Shahmukhi),  (Gurmukhi); Urdu: (Nasta'liq); Hindi: क़व्वाली (Devanagari);  Bengali: কাওয়ালি (Bengali)) is a form of Sufi Islamic devotional singing, originating in South Asia.

Originally performed at Sufi shrines or dargahs throughout South Asia, it gained mainstream popularity and an international audience in late 20th century. Qawwali music received international exposure through the work of Nusrat Fateh Ali Khan, Aziz Mian and Sabri Brothers largely due to several releases on the Real World label, followed by live appearances at WOMAD festivals. Other famous Qawwali singers include Fareed Ayyaz & Abu Muhammad, Rahat Fateh Ali Khan, Badar Miandad, Rizwan & Moazzam Duo, Qutbi Brothers, the late Amjad Sabri, Wadali Brothers, Nizami Bandhu, Bahauddin Qutbuddin, among others. Most modern Qawwali singers including Ustad Nusrat Fateh Ali Khan and Fareed Ayyaz & Abu Muhammad belong to the famed 'Qawwal Bachon ka Gharana' school of Qawwali, which was based in Delhi before 1947 and migrated to Pakistan.

Definition
Qawl is an "utterance (of the prophet)", Qawwāl is someone who often repeats (sings) a Qaul, Qawwāli is what a Qawwāl sings.

Origins

Delhi's Sufi saint Amir Khusrow of the Chisti order of Sufis is credited with fusing the Persian, Arabic, Turkish, and Indian traditions in the late 13th century in India to create Qawwali as we know it today. The word Sama is often still used in Central Asia and Turkey to refer to forms very similar to Qawwali, and in India, Pakistan and Bangladesh, the formal name used for a session of Qawwali is Mehfil-e-Sama.

Originally, musical instrument use in Qawwali was prohibited. The following conditions were initially placed on Qawwali:

Moreover, such Sufi Saints, such as Nizamuddin Auliya, the teacher of the famous Sufi singer, Amir Khusrow, were quite blunt about the prohibition:

Eventually however, musical instrument use found its way into Qawwali and modern performers of musical Qawwali will justify their use of instruments by saying that the Sufi Saints do not stop them when they use them near their shrines. Instruments such as Harmoniums, tabla and dholak are now common in many Qawwali parties.

Song content

	

The songs which constitute the qawwali repertoire are primarily in Persian, Urdu, Hindi, and Punjabi.  There are some in Persian from the Mughal era, and a smattering in Saraiki and dialects of north India like Braj Bhasha and Awadhi. There is also qawwali in some regional languages but the regional language tradition is relatively obscure. Also, the sound of the regional language qawwali can be totally different from that of mainstream qawwali. This is certainly true of Chhote Babu Qawwal, whose style of singing is much closer to the Bengali Baul music than to the qawwali of Nusrat Fateh Ali Khan, for example.

The poetry is implicitly understood to be spiritual in its meaning, even though the lyrics can sometimes sound wildly secular, or outright hedonistic. The central themes of qawwali are love, devotion and longing (of men for the Divine).

Qawwalis are classified by their content into several categories:
 A hamd (حمد), Arabic for praise, is a song in praise of Allah. Traditionally, a qawwali performance starts with a hamd.
 A na`at (نعت), Arabic for description, is a song in praise of Muhammad. The opening hamd is traditionally followed by a naat.
 A manqabat (plural manaqib, مناقب, which means characteristics) is a song in praise of either Imam Ali or one of the Sufi saints. Manaqib in praise of Ali are sung at both Sunni and Shi'a gatherings. If one is sung, it will follow right after the naat. There is usually at least one manqabat in a traditional programme. 
 A marsiya (مرثية), Arabic for lamentation for a dead person, is a lamentation over the death of much of Imam Husayn's family in the Battle of Karbala. This would typically be sung only at a Shi'a gathering.

 A ghazal (غزل), Arabic for love song, is a song that sounds secular on the face of it. There are two extended metaphors that run through ghazals—the joys of drinking and the agony of separation from the beloved. These songs feature exquisite poetry, and can certainly be taken at face value, and enjoyed at that level. In fact, in Pakistan and India, ghazal is also a separate, distinct musical genre in which many of the same songs are performed in a different musical style, and in a secular context. In the context of that genre, the songs are usually taken at face value, and no deeper meaning is necessarily implied. In the songs of intoxication, "wine" represents "knowledge of the Divine", the "cup-bearer" is God or a spiritual guide, the "tavern" is the metaphorical place where the soul may (or may not) be fortunate enough to attain spiritual enlightenment. (The "tavern" is emphatically not a conventional house of worship. Rather, it is taken to be the spiritual context within which the soul exists.) Intoxication is attaining spiritual knowledge, or being filled with the joy of loving the Divine. In the songs of yearning, the soul, having been abandoned in this world by that cruel and cavalier lover, God, sings of the agony of separation, and the depth of its yearning for reunion.
 A kafi is a poem in Punjabi, Seraiki or Sindhi, which is in the unique style of poets such as Sultan Bahoo, Shah Hussain, Bulleh Shah and Sachal Sarmast. Two of the more well-known Kafis include Ni Main Jana Jogi De Naal and Mera Piya Ghar Aaya.
 A munajaat (مناجاة), Arabic for a conversation in the night or a form of prayer, is a song where the singer displays his thanks to Allah through a variety of linguistic techniques. It is often sung in Persian, with Mawlana Jalāl-ad-Dīn Rumi credited as its author.

Composition of a qawwali party
A group of qawwali musicians, called a party (or Humnawa in Urdu), typically consists of eight or nine men including a lead singer, one or two side singers, one or two harmoniums (which may be played by the lead singer, side singer or someone else), and percussion. If there is only one percussionist, he plays the tabla and dholak, usually the tabla with the dominant hand and the dholak with the other one (i.e. a left-handed percussionist would play the tabla with his left hand). Often there will be two percussionists, in which case one might play the tabla and the other the dholak. There is also a chorus of four or five men who repeat key verses, and who aid percussion by hand-clapping.

The performers sit cross-legged on the ground in two rows — the lead singer, side singers and harmonium players in the front row, and the chorus and percussionists in the back row.

Before the fairly recent introduction of the harmonium, qawwalis were usually accompanied by the sarangi. The sarangi had to be retuned between songs; the harmonium didn't, and was soon preferred.

Women used to be excluded from traditional Muslim music, since they are traditionally prohibited from singing in the presence of men.  These traditions have changed, however, as is evident by the popularity (and acceptance) of female singers such as Abida Parveen.  However, qawwali has remained an exclusively male business.  There are still no mainstream female qawwals.  Although kafi singer Abida Parveen has increasingly incorporated qawwali techniques into her performances, she is still not considered a qawwali singer.

Musical structure of Qawwali
The longest recorded commercially released qawwali runs slightly over 115 minutes (Hashr Ke Roz Yeh Poochhunga by Aziz Mian Qawwal). The qawwali maestro Nusrat Fateh Ali Khan has at least two songs that are more than 60 minutes long.

Qawwalis tend to begin gently and build steadily to a very high energy level in order to induce hypnotic states both among the musicians and within the audience. Almost all Qawwalis are based on a Raga from the Hindustani classical music tradition. Songs are usually arranged as follows:

 They start with an instrumental prelude where the main melody is played on the harmonium, accompanied by the tabla, and which may include improvised variations of the melody.
 Then comes the alap, a long tonal improvised melody during which the singers intone different long notes, in the raga of the song to be played.
 The lead singer begins to sing some preamble verses which are typically not part of the main song, although thematically related to it. These are sung unrhythmically, improvised following the raga, and accompanied only by the harmonium. After the lead singer sings a verse, one of the side singers will repeat the verse, perhaps with his own improvisation. A few or many verses will be sung in this way, leading into the main song.
 As the main song begins, the tabla, dholak and clapping begin. All members join in the singing of the verses that constitute the refrain. The lyrics of the main verses are never improvised; in fact, these are often traditional songs sung by many groups, especially within the same lineage. However, the tunes are subtly improvised within the framework of the main melody. As the song proceeds, the lead singer or one of the side singers may break out into an alap. Nusrat Fateh Ali Khan also popularized the interjection of sargam singing at this point. The song usually builds in tempo and passion, with each singer trying to outdo the other in terms of vocal acrobatics. Some singers may do long periods of sargam improvisation, especially alternating improvisations with a student singer. The songs usually end suddenly.

The singing style of qawwali is different from Western singing styles in many ways. For example, in words beginning with an "m", Western singers are apt to stress the vowel following the "m" rather than the "m" itself, whereas in qawwali, the "m" will usually be held, producing a muted tone. Also in qawwali, there is no distinction between what is known as the chest voice and the head voice (the different areas that sound will resonate in depending on the frequency sung). Rather, qawwals sing very loudly and forcefully, which allows them to extend their chest voice to much higher frequencies than those used in Western singing, even though this usually causes a more noisy or strained sound than what would be acceptable in the West.

Notable Qawwals of the past 70 years 
 Aziz Mian
 Badar Ali Khan, (also known as Badar Miandad)
 Bahauddin Qutbuddin
 Fateh Ali Khan
 Prabha Bharti
 Habib Painter
 Iqbal Hussain Khan Bandanawazi 
 Mere Bane Ki Baat Na Pucho
 Munshi Raziuddin
 Nizami Bandhu
 Nusrat Fateh Ali Khan
 Sabri Brothers
 Wadali Brothers
 Warsi Brothers
 Qutbi Brothers

Current and recent Qawwals
 Ateeq Hussain Khan
 Abdullah Manzoor Niazi
 Faiz Ali Faiz
 Fareed Ayaz 
 Dhruv Sangari
 Rahat Fateh Ali Khan
 Sukhawat Ali Khan 
 Rizwan Muazzam 
 Waheed and Naveed Chishti
 Warsi Brothers
 Qutbi Brothers
 Tahir Faridi Qawwal
 Aminah Chishti Qawwal, first female Qawwal
 Amjad Sabri
 Abida Parveen
 Sanam Marvi

See also
 Filmi qawwali
 Islamic music
 Music of Bangladesh
 Music of India
 Music of Pakistan
 Religious ecstasy
 Sama (Sufism)
 Sufi music
 Urban Qawwali

References

External links
 A Qawwali being performed by Ustad Nusrat Fateh Ali Khan in the 1990s
 BBC Radio 3 Audio (45 minutes): The Nizamuddin shrine in Delhi. Accessed 25 November 2010.
 BBC Radio 3 Audio (45 minutes): A mahfil Sufi gathering in Karachi. Accessed 25 November 2010.
 Origin and History of the Qawwali, Adam Nayyar, Lok Virsa Research Centre, Islamabad. 1988.

 
Indian styles of music
Islam in India
Islam in Pakistan
Islamic music
Muhajir culture
Pakistani culture
Pakistani styles of music

Sufism in Pakistan
Articles containing video clips
Islamic terminology